KFYN may refer to:

 KFYN (AM), a radio station (1420 AM) licensed to serve Bonham, Texas, United States
 KFYN-FM, a radio station (104.3 FM) licensed to serve Detroit, Texas